Kyra  may refer to:

Places
 Kyra, Cyprus, a village
 Kyra, Russia, a rural locality (selo) in Zabaykalsky Krai
 Kyra River, a river in Kyra, Russia

Given name
 Kyra (given name)
 Kyra (Charmed), a fictional character in the TV series Charmed
 Kyra, a major character in the movie The Chronicles of Riddick

Insects
 Kyra (genus), a genus of leafhoppers in the subfamily Deltocephalinae
 Kyra, a former snout moth genus of the Phycitini, now synonymized with Eurhodope

Other uses
 KYRA (FM), a radio station (92.7 FM) licensed to serve Thousand Oaks, California, United States

See also
 Kira (disambiguation)

